Dennit Morris (April 15, 1936 – April 28, 2014) was an American football linebacker who played three seasons in the National Football League (NFL) and American Football League (AFL). He played on two college national championship and two AFL championship teams.

References

See also
Other American Football League players

American Football League All-Star players
1936 births
2014 deaths
San Francisco 49ers players
Houston Oilers players
Oklahoma Sooners football players
American football linebackers
American Football League players